North East Warriors is the women's representative cricket team for the English historic counties of County Durham and Northumberland. They play their home matches at grounds across the two counties, including Stocksfield Cricket Club Ground, Stocksfield and Manor Road, Willington. They are captained by Laura Ellison.

The team was formed ahead of the 2020 season, with Durham and Northumberland deciding to merge at both youth and senior levels in order to provide a "united high performance pathway" for the region. Due to the COVID-19 pandemic, they did not take part in any formal competitions in 2020, only playing friendlies, but went on to compete in the Women's Twenty20 Cup in 2021 and 2022. They also contribute some players to the North Representative XI, and they are partnered with the regional team Northern Diamonds.

Players

Current squad
Based on squad announced for the 2022 season.  denotes players with international caps.

Seasons

Women's Twenty20 Cup

See also
 Durham Women cricket team
 Northumberland Women cricket team
 North Representative XI
 Durham County Cricket Club
 Northumberland County Cricket Club
 Northern Diamonds

References

Cricket in County Durham
Cricket in Northumberland
Women's cricket teams in England
2020 establishments in England
Cricket clubs established in 2020